The African Society for Mutual Relief was a mutual aid organization established in New York City in 1808. Its building was attacked in the 1834 anti-abolition riots.

Leaders of the group included William Hamilton, its first president; Cato Alexander, an inn keeper; Philip Bell, editor and publisher of The Colored American; and Abraham Lawrence, president of the Harlem Railroad.

References

Further reading 

 
 
 

1808 establishments in New York (state)
Service organizations based in the United States
Non-profit organizations based in New York City
Abolitionism in the United States
Pre-emancipation African-American history
Underground Railroad in New York (state)
African-American history in New York City